Motorama was an auto show staged by General Motors from 1949 to 1961.  Motorama may also refer to:

 Motorama (film), a 1991 film
 Motorama (band), a Russian post-punk band